The Other F Word is a 2011 American documentary film directed by independent filmmaker Andrea Blaugrund Nevins. The film explores the world of aging punk rock musicians, as they transition into parents and try to maintain the contrast between their anti-authoritarian lifestyle with the responsibilities of fatherhood, the titular "other F word". In addition to interviewing over twenty musicians from across the spectrum of the punk genre, including Mark Hoppus of Blink 182  and Fat Mike of NOFX,  the film also includes other emblematic figures of subculture such as professional skateboarder Tony Hawk, in a chronicle of the struggles and rewards that accompany raising their children.

It was released in the U.S. by Oscilloscope Laboratories in 2011.

Premise
Primarily rotating around interviews of Pennywise lead singer Jim Lindberg, the documentary intermittently switches amongst different musicians, as it jumps between their travels on the road doing concert tours and time spent at home with their kids. In the course of the movie, the interviews are interspersed with archived concert footage of the punk rockers, from recent shows as well as their early years, to depict some of the challenges they face in their roles as parents - while at the same time maintaining their roles as anti-establishment figures for their punk rock fan following. Remarking that their adolescence often lacked much in the way of paternal guidance, the interviewees speak of how they earnestly are trying to be the supportive role models for their kids, that they themselves never had while growing up.

Featured interviews with
Tony Cadena - The Adolescents
Art Alexakis - Everclear
Rob Chaos - Total Chaos
Joe Escalante - The Vandals
Josh Freese - Session Drummer
Fat Mike - NOFX
Flea - Red Hot Chili Peppers
Lars Frederiksen - Rancid
Matt Freeman - Rancid
Jack Grisham - TSOL
Brett Gurewitz - Bad Religion
Tony Hawk - Pro Skater
Greg Hetson - Bad Religion, Circle Jerks
Mark Hoppus - blink-182
Jim Lindberg - Pennywise
Mike McDermott - Bouncing Souls
Tim McIlrath - Rise Against
Mark Mothersbaugh - Devo
Duane Peters - U.S. Bombs
Joe Sib - SideOneDummy Records
Ron Reyes - Black Flag
Rick Thorne - BMX Rider

Production
The film's first-time director Nevins, initially conceived of the idea for the documentary after reading a book by Jim Lindberg called "Punk Rock Dad", that explored his own feelings of being the raucous punk rocker of his band Pennywise, while at the same time raising kids. Thinking of the punk rock and fatherhood combination as a "fun oxymoron", Nevins originally believed the film would be in the spirit of a comedy, but after realizing how layered and heartfelt the experiences of the men she interviewed really were, the direction of the film changed significantly. The relatively low-cost budget of the film was maintained by the use of its inexpensive camera work and a soundtrack that features most of the artists interviewed throughout the film.

Box office
The Other F Word garnered $53,200 in gross earnings, bringing in $13,286 with its opening weekend premiere in two theaters.

Critical reception
The documentary received generally positive reviews from critics, with Jeanette Catsoulis of The New York Times describing it as "a compelling and often touching peek at punk paternity" and Joe Heim of The Washington Post praising the film's dual nature as "beautifully shot and requisitely gritty." Rotten Tomatoes lists twenty-two fresh reviews of the film giving it a 76% overall rating.

Awards
The 2011 South by Southwest film festival nominated The Other F Word for its "Films Presented" award.

References

External links

2011 documentary films
2011 films
American documentary films
American independent films
Documentary films about punk music and musicians
2010s English-language films
Films set in the 2000s
Films directed by Andrea Blaugrund Nevins
Films about parenting
2011 directorial debut films
2011 independent films
2010s American films